Julia Eichinger  (born 28 December 1992) is a German freestyle skier.
 
She competed in the 2018 Winter Olympics, in ski cross.

She participated in the 2015 FIS Freestyle World Ski Championships.

References

External links

1992 births
Living people
German female freestyle skiers 
Olympic freestyle skiers of Germany 
Freestyle skiers at the 2018 Winter Olympics 
21st-century German women